Ramphastides is an infraorder of the order Piciformes that includes toucans and barbets. Formerly, the barbets have been classified in a single family, the Capitonidae. However, this has turned out to be paraphyletic with regard to toucans, which resulted in the Capitonidae being split into several families.

Systematics
The Ramphastides contain five extant families. Sometimes, they are treated as the superfamily Ramphastoidea.

Infraorder Ramphastides 
Megalaimidae - Asian barbets
Lybiidae - African barbets
Capitonidae - New World barbets
Semnornithidae - toucan-barbets
Ramphastidae - toucans

References

External links
 Tree of Life Piciformes

Pici (taxon)
Neognathae